Gretna zaremba, commonly known as the variegated crepuscular skipper, is a species of butterfly in the family Hesperiidae. It is found in Nigeria, Cameroon, the Republic of the Congo, the Central African Republic and Uganda. The habitat consists of forests.

Subspecies
Gretna zaremba zaremba (Nigeria: Cross River loop, Cameroon, Congo, Central African Republic)
Gretna zaremba jacksoni Evans, 1937 (Uganda)

References

Butterflies described in 1884
Hesperiinae
Butterflies of Africa